Amgueddfa Cymru – Museum Wales, branded as simply Amgueddfa Cymru (formerly the National Museums and Galleries of Wales and legally National Museum of Wales), is a Welsh Government sponsored body that comprises seven museums in Wales:

 National Museum Cardiff – formerly the National Museum of Wales
 St Fagans National Museum of History, Cardiff
 Big Pit National Coal Museum, Blaenavon
 National Wool Museum, Dre-fach Felindre near Llandysul
 National Slate Museum, Llanberis
 National Roman Legion Museum, Caerleon
 National Waterfront Museum, Swansea

In addition to these sites, the organisation runs Oriel y Parc, a gallery of Welsh landscape art in St David's, in partnership with the Pembrokeshire Coast National Park Authority. The National Collections Centre in Nantgarw is AC-NMW's storage facility.

Directors of the National Museum of Wales
 William Evans Hoyle (1908–1924)
 Sir Mortimer Wheeler (1925–1926)
 Sir Cyril Fox (1926–1948)
 D. Dilwyn John (1948–1968)
 Gwyn Jones (1968–1977)
 Douglas Bassett (1977–1985)
 David W. Dykes (1986–1989)
 Alastair Wilson (1989–1993)
 Colin Ford (1993–1998)
 Anna Southall (1998–2002) 
 Michael Houlihan (2003–2010)
 David Anderson (2010–)

Visitor numbers

In 2017 over 1.89m visitors attended the National Museum sites. The most popular site for 2017 was St. Fagans and in 2016 the most popular attraction was National Museum Cardiff.

Notes

Further reading 
 Rhiannon Mason, Museums, Nations, Identities: Wales and its National Museums, Cardiff, University of Wales Press, 2007, 256 p.

External links 
 
 

Welsh Government sponsored bodies
 
Research organisations based in Wales